Parchi may refer to:
Parchi, Azerbaijan
Parchi, Iran
Parchi, alternate name of Pakajik, Iran
Parchi (film), a 2018 Pakistani film